DMZ Peace Train Music Festival is a music festival held in Cheorwon County, Gangwon Province, South Korea. It is held close to the border with North Korea, and is intended to promote peace and unification at a place symbolizing division of the Korean Peninsula. It was held as relations between the two Koreas warmed up.

Hosted by Seoul City, Cheorwon County, and Gangwon Province, the event was created when Glastonbury Festival and The Great Escape Festival main booker Martin Elbourne visited Korea in 2017 and visited the DMZ with Zandari Festa organizers Dalse Kong Yoon-young and Lee Dong-yeon. Elbourne returned in January 2018 and convinced Seoul Mayor Park Won-soon, Gangwon Governor Choi Moon-soon and Culture Minister Do Jong-hwan to fund the festival. In 2019 the event has additional sponsorship support from the Korea Tourism Organization. The festival is managed domestically, while Elbourne serves on the advisory committee alongside Stephen Budd of Africa Express and Martin Goldschmidt of Cooking Vinyl.

Location

The festival was held in various locations in Seoul and Cheorwon in its first two years. Seminars were held at Seoul's Platform Changdong 61, June 21-22, prior to the main festival days. On June 23-24, Goseokjeong Pavilion in Cheorwon right outside the DMZ served as the main venue for the free festival, with smaller limited-access events held within the DMZ at Woljeong-ri station and the ruins of the Workers' Party of Korea headquarters. Some participants took the DMZ Train to Cheorwon for a special program. 

For 2019, DMZ Peace Train Music Festival was held on June 5-9 at Goseokjeong, as well as around the ruins of the former headquarters of the Workers’ Party of Korea as well as near Woljeong-ri Station and Soisan mountain. Talks were held at Platform Changdong 61 on June 5 and 6.

North Korea was alerted about the festival so the noise would not be misunderstood.

Contrary to many participants' expectations, they reported the festival was light-hearted and the location peaceful.

Tickets 

The first year was free entry, with 12,000 attendees RSVPing their attendance. For the second year, tickets are being sold in order to help the local economy and prevent no-shows. Festivalgoers receive vouchers equivalent to the ticket price which may be redeemed at local businesses.

Line-ups

2018
Sex Pistols founding bassist Glen Matlock made headlines when he agreed to perform the festival, requesting organisers only cover his airfare. Matlock performed solo, as well as with Korean punk bands Crying Nut and No Brain member Cha-Cha. 

It was reported the organizers wanted to invite North Korean musicians to perform, although that ended up not happening.

2019
The second festival took place during a stall in US-DPRK negotiations. 

The number of foreign acts increased from 12 to 17. Seoul Community Radio hosted a new dance stage at the event. 

Former Velvet Underground member John Cale was announced as one of the foreign headliners, along with Korean-Chinese rock legend Cui Jian and Seun Kuti, son of Nigerian musician Fela Kuti, and Danish punk band Iceage. Additionally two former North Koreans performed: pianist Kim Cheol-woong and Korean-Japanese producer DJ Little Big Bee, who was banned from visiting South Korea until recently.

The following performed in the main festival site at Goseokjeong.

There were also special performances held at more sensitive locations within the DMZ, including a 10-person band featuring indie musicians and dancers inspired by military music.

See also

List of music festivals in South Korea
List of music festivals

References

External links
 Official website 
 Facebook page 

Music festivals established in 2018
Music festivals in South Korea
Peace festivals
Summer festivals
Rock festivals in South Korea
Annual events in South Korea
Summer events in South Korea